13 Rivers is the eighteenth solo studio album by British singer/songwriter Richard Thompson. It was released on 14 September 2018 by New West Records in the US and by Proper in the UK.

Background
13 Rivers was written after a period of difficulty for Thompson's family with songs that stick "close to a vision of darkness, gloom, and noise". Thompson explains that the songs were written in a "fairly tight time period of about six months", giving them a sense of commonality. He states that "many of these songs came to him as a pleasant surprise and that feeling of grabbing the creative urge and running with it is what comes across throughout the running time".

The album was self-produced by Thompson with the album and some minor overdubs being recorded entirely on analogue equipment over a 10 day period.

The album title derives from the song count, with Thompson explaining that "there are 13 songs on the record, and each one is like a river. Some flow faster than others". This is illustrated further by the album's internal artwork which features a map, "showing the individual songs on the album flowing into a central lake".

Critical reception

On Metacritic, which aggregates reviews from critics and assigns a normalised rating out of 100, 13 Rivers received a score of 81, based on 1 mixed and 6 positive reviews.

The album received generally favourable reviews from the press, with it being described as "brilliant" and "engaging" by PopMatters who state that 13 Rivers is "a raw, unfiltered affair from a veteran artist who shows no signs of slowing down". Folk Radio UK call 13 Rivers "a toothy energetic album" and Uncut write that "13 Rivers is a sparse, raging and noisy record". The Irish Times agreed that "the tone is ominous from the get-go"" and Mojo write that "this may be Richard Thompson's most creative album in decades" describing the record as being "driven along by a renewed sense of urgency and purpose". NPR feel that the album has captured Thompson's live sound, explaining that "the live show is always spectacular, and on 13 Rivers, Thompson more than manages to bring that live energy and those searing and soaring guitar solos to life in the studio". AllMusic write that "Thompson's vocals are superb throughout" claiming that "13 Rivers is striking music from a musician who remains fresh, contemporary, and peerless".

Track listing
All tracks written by Richard Thompson

"The Storm Won't Come" – 6:11
"The Rattle Within" – 3:06
"Her Love Was Meant for Me" – 5:01
"Bones of Gilead" – 4:21
"The Dog in You" – 4:54
"Trying" – 3:35
"Do All These Tears Belong to You?" – 4:13
"My Rock, My Rope" – 3:19
"You Can't Reach Me" – 3:58
"O, Cinderella" – 3:49
"No Matter" – 3:46
"Pride" – 3:17
"Shaking the Gates" – 4:00

Personnel
Richard Thompson – vocals, guitar and keyboards
Michael Jerome – drums, percussion and vocals
Taras Prodaniuk – bass guitar and vocals
Bobby Eichorn – guitar
Siobhan Maher Kennedy – harmony vocal
Judith Owen – harmony vocal on "No Matter"
Zara Phillips – harmony vocal

Charts

References

External links

Richard Thompson (musician) albums
2018 albums
New West Records albums
Proper Records albums